The 9th constituency of Val-d'Oise is a French legislative constituency in the Val-d'Oise département.  It is currently represented by Zivka Park of La République En Marche! (LREM).

Description

The 9th constituency of Val-d'Oise covers the eastern end of the department and is centred on the town of Goussainville which lies close to Charles de Gaulle Airport.

Since 1988 the seat has swung between left and right and has only been retained by the incumbent once during that time, by the PS in 2002.

Historic Representation

Election results

2022

 
 
 
 
 
 
 
 
|-
| colspan="8" bgcolor="#E9E9E9"|
|-

2017

2012

 
 
 
 
 
|-
| colspan="8" bgcolor="#E9E9E9"|
|-

2007

 
 
 
 
 
 
|-
| colspan="8" bgcolor="#E9E9E9"|
|-

2002

 
 
 
 
 
|-
| colspan="8" bgcolor="#E9E9E9"|
|-

1997

 
 
 
 
 
 
 
 
|-
| colspan="8" bgcolor="#E9E9E9"|
|-

Sources
Official results of French elections from 2002: "Résultats électoraux officiels en France" (in French).

9